The Dent Bridge is a suspension bridge in the northwest United States, located in north central Idaho in Clearwater County, north of Orofino. It is  up the North Fork of the Clearwater River, now Dworshak Reservoir.

History
Built in conjunction with the Dworshak Dam by the U.S. Army Corps of Engineers during the early 1970s, this bridge provides local access over the flooded river, now Dworshak Reservoir. It replaced a smaller bridge which crossed the river prior to the flooding by the reservoir. Without the bridge, vehicle access from Ahsahka to the small community of Elk River would be blocked off. The Corps of Engineers carefully weighed the possibilities for getting traffic to Elk River from the Orofino side of the Clearwater River. The only reasonable answer was a bridge somewhere in the middle of the future reservoir. The exact location was based on the topography most suitable for road access as well as for the bridge construction itself.

The bridge takes its name from Charles and Katherine Dent, who in 1895 owned land on the western side of where the bridge now stands. The settlement of Dent was razed prior to being flooded by the reservoir.

References

External links
Dent Bridge – Highest Bridges
Dent Bridge – Bridgehunter
Dent Bridge – Bridgemeister

Bridges completed in 1971
Suspension bridges in the United States
Buildings and structures in Clearwater County, Idaho
Transportation in Clearwater County, Idaho
Road bridges in Idaho
Towers in Idaho